Between Showers is a 1914 short film made by Keystone Studios and directed by Henry Lehrman. It starred Charlie Chaplin, Ford Sterling, Emma Clifton, and Chester Conklin.

Plot
Chaplin and Sterling play two young men, Masher and Rival Masher, who fight over the chance to help a young woman (Clifton) cross a muddy street. Sterling first sees the woman trying to cross and offers her an umbrella he stole from a policeman (Conklin).  He asks her to wait for him as he goes to get something to help her. Chaplin comes along and offers the woman to help her cross the street as well and wait for his return. While Sterling and Chaplin go to get logs, another policeman (Nolan) lifts the woman across the street. When Sterling returns with the log, he is indignant that the woman did not wait for him to come back to help her cross the muddy street and demands the umbrella back. When the woman refuses, they engage in a fight which eventually involves Chaplin.

Review
A British movie magazine, The Cinema, provided this review of Between Showers:  "[It's] a screamingly funny comedy, featuring Charles Chaplin and a charming girl.  All the trouble is caused by an umbrella, and two men's rivalry for the favour of the lady.  Their efforts to outdo each other in gallantry create many humorous situations."

Cast
Charlie Chaplin - Masher (The Tramp)
Ford Sterling - Rival Masher
Chester Conklin - Policeman
Edward Nolan - Chivalrous Policeman
Emma Clifton - Lady in Distress
Sadie Lampe - Policeman's Lady Friend

See also
 Charlie Chaplin filmography

External links
 
 
 
 

1914 films
1914 comedy films
American silent short films
American black-and-white films
Films directed by Henry Lehrman
Films produced by Mack Sennett
Silent American comedy films
Articles containing video clips
1914 short films
American comedy short films
Mutual Film films
1910s English-language films
1910s American films
English-language comedy films